The 1922 Bradley Indians football team was an American football team that represented Bradley Polytechnic Institute — now  known as Bradley University — as an independent during the 1922 college football season. In Alfred J. Robertson's third season as head coach, the team compiled an undefeated record of 9–0–1 and outscored opponents by a total of 243 to 33.

The team was recognized as a co-champion with  among the minor college football teams in Illinois. After the season ended, the school applied for admission to the Illinois Intercollegiate Athletic Conference (IIAC), and the application was unanimously approved.

Key players included halfback Bunny Gross who was called "one of the fastest football players who ever donned a uniform at Bradley." Fullback Golden Babcock was the team captain. Leo Johnson was the assistant coach.

Schedule

References

Bradley
Bradley Braves football seasons
College football undefeated seasons
Bradley Indians football